Kladnitsa Peak is the ice-covered peak of elevation 1103 m on Pernik Peninsula, Loubet Coast in Graham Land, Antarctica.  It surmounts McCance Glacier to the south and west, and Darbel Bay to the northeast.

The peak is named after the settlement of Kladnitsa in Western Bulgaria.

Location
British mapping in 1976.

Maps
 Antarctic Digital Database (ADD). Scale 1:250000 topographic map of Antarctica. Scientific Committee on Antarctic Research (SCAR). Since 1993, regularly upgraded and updated.
British Antarctic Territory. Scale 1:200000 topographic map. DOS 610 Series, Sheet W 66 64. Directorate of Overseas Surveys, Tolworth, UK, 1976.

Notes

References
 Bulgarian Antarctic Gazetteer. Antarctic Place-names Commission. (details in Bulgarian, basic data in English)
 Kladnitsa Peak. SCAR Composite Antarctic Gazetteer

External links
 Kladnitsa Peak. Copernix satellite image

Mountains of Graham Land
Bulgaria and the Antarctic
Loubet Coast